Hubert Adamczyk (born 23 February 1998) is a Polish professional footballer who plays as a midfielder for Arka Gdynia.

Club career
Adamczyk began his career at Zawisza Bydgoszcz, of his hometown, Bydgoszcz. He was signed by English Premier League side Chelsea in 2014.

After leaving Chelsea in January 2016, Adamczyk joined Cracovia of Poland. He made his debut on 6 March, coming on as a sub in the 91st minute for Jakub Wójcicki against Lech Poznań in a 2-1 defeat.

On 31 August 2017 he was loaned to Olimpia Grudziądz.

Career statistics

Notes

References 

1998 births
Living people
Polish footballers
Polish expatriate footballers
Poland youth international footballers
Association football midfielders
Chelsea F.C. players
MKS Cracovia (football) players
Olimpia Grudziądz players
Wisła Płock players
GKS Tychy players
Arka Gdynia players
Ekstraklasa players
I liga players
Sportspeople from Bydgoszcz
Polish expatriate sportspeople in England
Expatriate footballers in England